Mała Noteć is a river of Poland, a tributary of the Noteć in Pakość.

Rivers of Poland
Rivers of Kuyavian-Pomeranian Voivodeship